Anna Fernstädt (born 23 November 1996 in Prague), also known as Anna Fernstädtová, is a Czech-German skeleton racer who competes on the Skeleton World Cup circuit. She started competing in 2011 and was selected to the German national team in 2013. In May 2018, she announced on her personal Twitter account that she was joining the Czech Republic team for the 2018–19 season.

Notable results 
Fernstädt started competing on the Europe Cup in 2013–14, where she quickly established herself with a string of five podium finishes, including three golds. She had fewer podiums in 2014–15, when she added the Intercontinental Cup to her schedule, but she had two ICC wins in 2015–16 and 2016–17. She finished fifth in the 2015 junior world championships at Altenberg, and earned bronze the following year in Winterberg.

Fernstädt's first season on the World Cup was 2016–17 when her best finish was a bronze at Königssee; that season, the world championships were held on the same Königssee track, and Fernstädt finished fourth but earned a bronze as part of an international squad in the mixed team competition. She started the 2017–18 season on the ICC but was promoted to the World Cup squad in the place of Sophia Griebel after winning three ICC races. She took bronze in the 2018 race at Altenberg, and won the 2018 Junior World Championships by 0.81 seconds, ahead of 2017 champion Yulia Kanakina.

After switching teams to the Czech Republic, Fernstädt competed at lower levels for the 2018–19 season to earn her new team a World Cup quota spot for the 2019–20 season.

World Cup results
All results are sourced from the International Bobsleigh and Skeleton Federation (IBSF).

References

External links
 
 
 
 
 

1996 births
Living people
Sportspeople from Prague
Czech female skeleton racers
German female skeleton racers
Olympic skeleton racers of Germany
Skeleton racers at the 2018 Winter Olympics
Skeleton racers at the 2022 Winter Olympics
Olympic skeleton racers of the Czech Republic
Czech people of German descent
German people of Czech descent